Petar "Peter" Baralic (Serbian Cyrillic: Петар Баралић, born 3 October 1951) is a retired Yugoslavian National Team and Olympic Team "Captain" football player who played professionally in Europe and in the North American Soccer League and Major Indoor Soccer League.  He played for the highly ranked Red Star team in Europe. He coached the Arizona Sandsharks and Arizona Thunder. He also coached the Phoenix Hearts of the Southwest Indoor Soccer League.  He was the 1990 SISL Coach of the Year.

Player
In Yugoslavia, he played for Borac Čačak and Red Star Belgrade. 

In 1979, Baralic signed with the Tampa Bay Rowdies of the North American Soccer League.  He played two seasons with the Rowdies, including the 1979-1980 NASL indoor season.  In January 1981, the Detroit Express purchased Baralic from the Rowdies.  At the end of the 1980-1981 NASL indoor season, the Express moved to Washington, D.C. and were renamed the Washington Diplomats.  In the fall of 1981, Baralic moved to the Baltimore Blast of the Major Indoor Soccer League.  He played four seasons in the MISL for the Blast, Phoenix Pride and Kansas City Comets.

Coach
In 1987, Baralic became the head coach of the semi-professional indoor club, the Phoenix Heat.  In 1990, he was hired as the head coach of the Phoenix Hearts of the Southwest Indoor Soccer League.  He was the 1989-90 Southwest Independent Soccer League indoor season Coach of the Year.

References

External links
NASL/MISL stats

1951 births
Living people
Sportspeople from Čačak
Serbian footballers
Yugoslav footballers
Yugoslav expatriate footballers
FK Borac Čačak players
Red Star Belgrade footballers
Yugoslav First League players
Baltimore Blast (1980–1992) players
Detroit Express players
Kansas City Comets (original MISL) players
Major Indoor Soccer League (1978–1992) players
North American Soccer League (1968–1984) indoor players
North American Soccer League (1968–1984) players
Phoenix Pride players
Tampa Bay Rowdies (1975–1993) players
Washington Diplomats (NASL) players
Serbian expatriate footballers
Expatriate soccer players in the United States
USISL coaches
Serbian football managers
Yugoslav football managers
Association football forwards
Association football midfielders